Squadron Capital was an investment advisory firm headquartered in Hong Kong, focused on private equity investment within the Asia Pacific region.

Background
Squadron Capital was established in 2006.  The firm is a subsidiary of Search Investment Group, a Hong Kong-based private investment firm established by Robert Warren Miller in the early 1970s.  The founding professionals, led by David G Pierce, were previously employees of Search Investment Group, at which they managed the Group's private equity funds and direct investments portfolios.

Squadron Capital Advisors Limited became regulated by the Hong Kong Securities and Futures Commission in connection with plans to manage private capital for investors other than Search Investment Group. The firm also registered as an investment advisor with the United States Securities and Exchange Commission. The management of third-party assets began in 2007.

Squadron Capital was put up for sale in 2012, and in October of that year the firm was acquired by a US private equity investor named FLAG Capital.

Investment Programs and Clients
Investment programs managed and supervised by Squadron Capital included funds-of-funds as well as separate accounts.  The firm’s investment programs sought to achieve superior, risk-adjusted returns for investors from investments mainly in diversified portfolios of primary and secondary interests in private equity funds as well as opportunistically in co-investments, principally within the Asia Pacific region.

Squadron Capital’s clients included a range of institutional investors, among them public and corporate pension funds, insurance companies, university endowments, as well as family offices and private investors.  The firm's clients came from various countries of the Asia Pacific region as well as from Europe, the Middle East and North America.

References

 Seizing the Tiger's Tail Limited Partner Magazine, Q1 2012
 Squadron Capital in new $150 million fund Asia Asset Management, 2011
 Sorting the wheat from the chaff Private Equity International, 2011
 Institutional Investor Profile: David G Pierce, CEO, Squadron Capital AltAssets, 2008
 Squadron plans $400 million fund for Asia Reuters, 2008
 Asian fund T&Cs acceptable, finds Squadron
 LP t&c issues as power balance shifts
 Funds of funds build LP returns

External links
 Squadron Capital (Company website)
 Search Investment Group
 SAIL Advisors

Private equity firms of Asia-Pacific
Private equity firms of Hong Kong